Jesse Randhawa (born 11 August 1975) is an Indian model and actress. She was a contestant on  Fear Factor: Khatron Ke Khiladi 2 where she emerged as the 1st runner-up.

Early life
Jasmeet Kaur Randhawa, a.k.a. Jesse Randhawa, was born on 11 August 1975 in Jaipur to Mehar and Narinder Singh Randhawa. She is originally from Jaipur.

Her sister Saadhika is a popular actress.

Career
Randhawa is a successful model and has worked with many designers. She appeared in Femina Miss India 1994 contest along with Sushmita Sen and Aishwarya Rai and made it to the finals. She also participated in  Fear Factor: Khatron Ke Khiladi 2, where she emerged as the 1st runner-up.

Film career
Firstly, she featured in a song Kadi Te Aana Balli Di Gali for the movie Jung starring Sanjay Dutt and Jackie Shroff. She did an item number for the film No Smoking. In 2009, Randhawa appeared in Anurag Kashyap's film Gulaal, in which she played the role of a young lecturer.

Personal life
Jesse Randhawa was previously married to fashion model Inder Mohan Sudan, but divorced him and married choreographer Sandip Soparrkar. Jesse Randhawa and Sandip Soparrkar guest-starred in Dance India Dance Grand Finale. Sandip Soparrkar and Jesse Randhawa got married in the year 2009 and announced separation in 2016 after matrimony for almost seven years.

Filmography
 Chot- Aj Isko, Kal Tereko as Kabir's girlfriend
 Sona Spa as Villain
 Love Khichdi as Susan Raj
 Gulaal as Anuja
 Fashion as Model Jasmeet
 No Smoking as Dancer/Singer
 Jung
 The Xpose as Shabnam

References

External links

 
 

1975 births
Living people
Female models from Rajasthan
Actresses from Jaipur
21st-century Indian actresses
Fear Factor: Khatron Ke Khiladi participants